Free Range Routing or FRRouting or FRR is a network routing software suite running on Unix-like platforms, particularly Linux, Solaris, OpenBSD, FreeBSD and NetBSD. It was created as a fork from Quagga. FRRouting is distributed under the terms of the GNU General Public License v2 (GPL2).

FRR provides implementations of the following protocols:
 Open Shortest Path First (OSPF)
 Routing Information Protocol (RIP)
 Border Gateway Protocol (BGP)
 IS-IS
 Label Distribution Protocol (LDP)
 Protocol Independent Multicast (PIM)
 Babel
 Bidirectional Forwarding Detection (BFD)
 Ethernet VPN (EVPN)
It also provides alpha implementations of:
 Next Hop Resolution Protocol (NHRP)
 Enhanced Interior Gateway Routing Protocol (EIGRP)

History 
FRRouting broke away from the free routing software Quagga. Several Quagga contributors, including Cumulus Networks, 6WIND, and BigSwitch Networks, citing frustration about the pace of development, decided to fork the software and form their own community.

See also 

 BIRD
 Quagga
 OpenOSPFD
 OpenBGPD

References

External links
 FRRouting Mailing Lists

Free routing software